Sibel Şimşek (born October 10, 1984, in Osmancık Çorum, Turkey) is a European champion Turkish weightlifter competing in the Women's 63 kg division.

Şimşek is a member of the Kocaeli Büyükşehir Belediyesi Kağıt Spor Kulübü. She is trained by Mehmet Üstündağ.

On 12 January 2017 it was announced that because of a doping violation she had been disqualified from the 2012 Olympic Games.

Achievements 

Olympic Games

World Championships

European Championships

References 

1984 births
Living people
People from Çorum
Weightlifters at the 2004 Summer Olympics
Weightlifters at the 2012 Summer Olympics
Olympic weightlifters of Turkey
World Weightlifting Championships medalists
Turkish female weightlifters
Turkish sportspeople in doping cases
Doping cases in weightlifting
Kocaeli Büyükşehir Belediyesi Kağıt Spor athletes
European champions in weightlifting
European champions for Turkey
Mediterranean Games gold medalists for Turkey
Mediterranean Games silver medalists for Turkey
Competitors at the 2009 Mediterranean Games
Competitors at the 2013 Mediterranean Games
Mediterranean Games medalists in weightlifting
European Weightlifting Championships medalists